Gregory Arnold Tribbett Jr. (born November 7, 1968) is an American guitarist who is one of the founding members, lead guitarist and backing vocalist of the metal band Mudvayne. He is also the former lead guitarist and backing vocalist of the metal bands Audiotopsy and Hellyeah. He's been with Mudvayne from their inception in 1996 until their dissolution in 2010, and again from 2021 to now. He has named Randy Rhoads as the guitarist who most influenced him.  Greg has 3 brothers; Derrick "Tripp" Tribbett, who previously played bass for Dope, and sang for Makeshift Romeo and Twisted Method, The Late Dustin "Diggz" Tribbett, once the bass player for Element, and Dead End Asylum, is now an independent musician and writer, and also Matt Tribbett, who was a drum technician for the American metal band Slipknot.

Career

Mudvayne 
Tribbett founded Mudvayne in 1996 in Peoria, Illinois. The lineup originally consisted of bassist Shawn Barclay, drummer Matthew McDonough, and Tribbett himself playing lead guitar. The band's original lineup finalized when Chad Gray, who was earning $40,000 a year in a factory, quit his day job to become its lead singer. Tribbett appeared on every one of the band's releases until they entered an indefinite hiatus in 2010, and he has been involved with Mudvayne's reunion since 2021.

Hellyeah 
In 2006, Tribbett joined Mudvayne's lead vocalist Chad Gray, rhythm guitarist Tom Maxwell and bassist Jerry Montano of Nothingface in forming the heavy metal/groove metal supergroup Hellyeah. He departed the band in 2014 to pursue other musical endeavors.

Audiotopsy 
In 2015, Tribbett formed the band Audiotopsy with former Skrape lead vocalist Billy Keeton, bassist Perry Stern, and former Mudvayne drummer Matthew McDonough. They released their debut studio album Natural Causes on October 2, 2015.
Their second album, The Real Now was released on November 2, 2018. In 2021, Greg and Matthew left Audiotopsy due to the reformation of Mudvayne.

Equipment 
Tribbett has been known to play a wide range of guitars, including Gibson Flying Vs, Gibson Les Pauls, Ibanez S-series, Ibanez Artists ARX300, Washburn Vs, and Legator Vs, the latter of which he currently endorses. Legator now makes a signature guitar for Tribbett.

Discography

Mudvayne 

Studio albums
 L.D. 50 (2000)
 The End of All Things to Come (2002)
 Lost and Found (2005)
 The New Game (2008)
 Mudvayne (2009)

Compilation Albums
 By the People, for the People (2007)
 Playlist: The Very Best of Mudvayne (2011)

EPs
 Kill, I Oughtta (1997)
 The Beginning of All Things to End (2001)
 Live Bootleg (2003)

Hellyeah 

Studio albums
 Hellyeah (2007)
 Stampede (2010)
 Band of Brothers (2012)

Audiotopsy 
Studio albums
 Natural Causes (2015)
 The Real Now (2018)

References

External links

1968 births
Living people
American heavy metal guitarists
Mudvayne members
Hellyeah members
Musicians from Peoria, Illinois
Alternative metal guitarists
Progressive metal guitarists
Guitarists from Illinois
American male guitarists
20th-century American guitarists